Annihilate This Week is the sixth EP by American hardcore punk band Black Flag. It contains songs from Who's Got the 10½? The cover, which features numerous items of drug paraphernalia, was banned in some record stores.

Track listing
Side one
"Annihilate This Week" (Ginn) – 4:14

Side two
"Best One Yet" (Roessler/Rollins) – 2:35
"Sinking" (Ginn/Rollins) – 5:04

Personnel
 Henry Rollins – vocals
 Greg Ginn – guitar
 Kira Roessler – bass
 Anthony Martinez – drums

References

1987 EPs
Black Flag (band) EPs
SST Records EPs